The Canadian sitcom Made in Canada aired from 1998 to 2003 on CBC Television.

Season 1
All six episodes of the first season were written by Mark Farrell and Rick Mercer, and were directed by Henry Sarwer-Foner.

Season 2

Season 3

Season 4

Season 5

Footnotes

Notes

References

External links

Made in Canada